The NCAA Final Four most often refers to the playoffs of the National Collegiate Athletic Association (Philippines) (NCAA) seniors' basketball tournament.

The term "final four" came from the United States National Collegiate Athletic Association's men's Division I basketball tournament which is colloquially called as the "final four" in that country. "Final Four" is now the American NCAA's registered trademark so that no other organizers within the United States can refer to contests or tournaments under that name.

The final four was instituted in 1997; prior to that the first and second round winners, plus the team with the best overall standing if it did not win either round, participated in the championship round to determine the champion.

Format
If no team sweeps the group stage:
Seeds No. 1 and No. 2 teams possess the twice to beat advantage
Team No. 1 meets No. 4 while No. 2 meets No. 3 in the semifinals.
The semifinal winners advance to the Finals.
The team that wins 2 games in the Finals wins the championship.
If a team sweeps the group stage:
Seed No. 1 advance to the Finals. 
Prior to 2008, the No. 1 seed had the twice-to-beat advantage in the finals.
From 2008 to 2009, the Finals was a best-of-three series.
Seed No. 2 advance to the semifinals.
Teams No. 3 and No. 4 face off to meet No. 2 in the semifinals in a one-game playoff.
In the finals, either the No. 1 seed or the other opponent has to win twice. From 2008 to 2016, seed No. 1 earned a thrice-to-beat advantage (or a 1−0 incentive lead in a virtual best-of-five Finals series).
In case of two teams being tied, an extra game will be played to determine which seed they will possess.
In case of three or more teams being tied, a quotient system will decide which team possesses the best seeding, while the other teams will play an extra game to determine the second-best seeding. The winner will face the holder of the best seeding for a playoff slot.

Results

Statistics

Seniors Tournament

Appearances

Notes:
 Number of appearances excludes 4th seed elimination games.
 PCU left the league

Best performances

Number denotes playoff seeding.
Shade denotes final position.

Notes:
a.AUF left the league.
b.PCU left the league.
c.2020-21 season had a basketball tournament, but it was basically a skills showdown, due to the restrictions of the COVID-19 pandemic in the Philippines.
d.2021-22 season was played in early 2022 and the tournament was held in into a round robin tournament instead of the usual double round eliminations.

Win–loss statistics

Semifinals and knockout games

Finals

Entire playoffs

Finals statistics
Most lopsided game: San Sebastian 95-62 JRC, 2001 Game 3 (33 points)
Closest game: Several games, all one-point leads:
Letran 75-74 JRC, 1999 Game 1
San Sebastian 79-78 Benilde, 2002 Game 1
San Beda 68-67 PCU, 2006 Game 3
Letran 65-64 San Beda, 2019 Game 1
Finals appearances: San Beda, 15; Letran 11; and San Sebastian, 9
Consecutive finals appearances: San Beda, 14 (2006–19); San Sebastian, 4 (2000–03)
Championships: San Beda (2006–08, 2010–14, 2016–18), 11; Letran(1998–99, 2003, 2005, 2015, 2019, 2021, 2022), 8;  San Sebastian (1997, 2001–02, 2009), 4
Consecutive championships: San Beda (2006–08, 2016–18), Letran (2019–22) 3; San Beda (2010–14), 5

Semifinals
Most lopsided game: Letran 93-60 SSC-R, 2005 (33 points)
Closest game: Several games, all one point leads
Letran 65-64 PCU, 2004 (1 point)
Letran 91-90 Mapua, 2015 (1 point)
Benilde 62-61 San Beda, 2022 (1 point)
Semifinal appearances: San Beda 19, Letran 18, San Sebastian 15, JRU 13
Consecutive semifinal appearances: San Beda 8 (2011-2018), Letran 7 (2003–2009), San Sebastian 6 (1998–2003), JRU 5 (1999-2003, 2007-2011)

Most frequent matchups
The most frequently played matchups are:

Seeds
In the 25 tournaments the Final Four format has been applied, the higher seed has beaten the lower seeds in the semifinals due to their twice to beat advantage, for the most part:
 The No. 1 seed has beaten the No. 4 seed 19 out of 22 times (86%)
The No. 1 seed has beaten the No. 4 seed 15 times on the first game (79%).
The No. 1 seed has beaten the No. 4 seed 4 times on the second game (21%)
The only times the No. 1 seed was beaten by the No. 4 seed were during the San Sebastian-Letran matchup in 1999 (Letran won), and the JRC-San Sebastian matchup in 2000 (San Sebastian won).
 The No. 2 seed has beaten the No. 3 seed 21 out of 24 times (88%).
 The No. 2 seed has beaten the No. 3 seed 13 times on the first game (62%).
 The No. 2 seed has beaten the No. 3 seed 6 times on the second game (29%).
 The No. 2 seed has beaten the No. 3 seed 2 times in a knockout game due to the stepladder format (9%).
The only times the No. 2 seed doesn't have a twice to beat advantage against the No. 3 seed were during the San Beda-Letran matchup in 1997 (San Beda won), the San Sebastian-JRU matchup in 2010 (San Sebastian won), and the Lyceum-Letran matchup in 2019 (Letran won) due to the stepladder format.
The only times the No. 2 seed was beaten by the No. 3 seed were during the Perpetual Help-CSB matchup in 2000 (CSB won), the San Sebastian-Letran matchup in 2012 (Letran won), and the Lyceum-Letran matchup in 2019 (Letran won) due to the stepladder format.
 The No. 2 seed has beaten the No. 4 seed once (100%)
The only time the No. 2 seed has beaten the No. 4 seed was during the San Beda-San Sebastian matchup in 2017 (San Beda won) due to the stepladder format.
 The No. 3 seed has beaten the No. 4 seed 3 out of 4 times (75%)
 With San Sebastian sweeping the group stage, there were two semifinal rounds for 1997.
 With San Beda sweeping the group stage, there were two semifinal rounds for 2010 and 2019.
 With Lyceum sweeping the group stage, there were two semifinal rounds for 2017.
 The No. 1 seed skipped the semifinals four times (16%; in 1997, when San Sebastian swept the group stage, in 2010 and 2019, when San Beda swept the group stage, and in 2017, when Lyceum swept the group stage)
A victory of the No. 3 and No. 4 seeds in a series are considered big upsets considering that the No. 3 and No. 4 seed have to win twice, not to mention the perceived superiority of the No. 1 and No. 2 seeds when compared to the No. 3 and No. 4 seeds.

In the finals, the advantage of the No. 1 seed isn't as pronounced since the competing teams have to win the same number of games:
 The No. 1 seed has beaten the No. 2 seed 15 of 21 times (71%)
 The No. 2 seed has beaten the No. 1 seed 6 of 21 times (29%)
 The No. 1 seed has beaten the No. 3 seed 1 of 2 times (50%)
 The No. 3 seed has beaten the No. 1 seed 1 of 2 times (50%)
 The No. 3 seed has beaten the No. 4 seed once (100%)
This occurred in 2000 in which both lower seeded teams upset the teams with the twice to beat advantage. This was the only time were both teams possessing the twice to beat advantage failed to qualify for the finals in both the NCAA and the UAAP.
 The No. 4 seed has beaten the No. 2 seed once (100%)
 The No. 1 seed has won the championship 16 of 25 times (64%)

Individual single-game records
Stats since the 2001 season.

Juniors Tournament

Appearances

Notes:
 Number of appearances excludes 4th seed elimination games.

Best performances

Notes:
a.The Mapúa High School was closed down in 2005. Since 2008, the Malayan High School of Science Red Robins represented Mapúa University in the juniors' division.
b.2022-23 season was played in early 2023 and the tournament was held in into a round robin tournament instead of the usual double round eliminations.

Television and radio
The Final Four is the culmination of the NCAA basketball season and is heavily covered by the media. With the NCAA as one of the leading collegiate leagues in the country, the Final Four games are broadcast live throughout the country.

Beginning in 2015, the NCAA, and the Final Four games, are broadcast by ABS-CBN's UHF channel ABS-CBN Sports+Action nationwide, being produced by ABS-CBN Sports. Previously, Studio 23 covered the NCAA from 2002 until 2011. Prior to Studio 23, the games were broadcast irregularly by different broadcast partners. From 2009 to 2011 and since 2015, the games are also aired in high definition, through Balls subsidiary Balls HD.

Previous nationwide providers of the NCAA were Vintage Television on People's Television Network and later IBC from 1995 until 1999 and PTV Channel 4 from 2000 until 2001 season. PTV's coverage was produced by MCI Group and later Silvestar Sports.

In 2012, the NCAA, and the Final Four games were broadcast by TV5's VHF channel IBC's AKTV, being produced by Sports5. From 2013 to 2014 TV5 took over the seniors' games coverage after AKTV was dissolved.

See also
UAAP Final Four

References

Final Four